Kaoh Thum District is a district (srok) of Kandal Province, Cambodia. The district is subdivided into 11 communes (khum) such as Chheu Khmau, Chrouy Ta Kaev, Kampong Kong, Kaoh Thum Ka, Kaoh Thum Kha, Leuk Daek, Preaek Chrey, Preaek Sdei, Preaek Thmei, Sampov Lun, Pouthi Ban and 93 villages (phum).

References

External links
Kandal at Royal Government of Cambodia website
Kandal at Ministry of Commerce website

Districts of Kandal province